CLC (an acronym for CrystaL Clear) was a South Korean girl group formed by Cube Entertainment. The group's final lineup was composed of Seunghee, Yujin, Seungyeon, Yeeun and Eunbin. Members Elkie and Sorn departed in 2021.

Their debut EP First Love was released on March 19, 2015, with five group members: Seunghee, Yujin, Seungyeon, Sorn and Yeeun. The remaining two members, Elkie and Eunbin, were added to the group with the release of their third EP, Refresh, on February 29, 2016, though Eunbin did not participate in official promotions until the release of their fourth EP, Nu.Clear, in May 2016.

The group disbanded on May 20, 2022, after Cube Entertainment announced the same day that their "official activities" have ended with their CLC U Cube global fansite service discontinued on June 6.

History

Pre-debut
The five original members of CLC (Seunghee, Yujin, Seungyeon, Sorn and Yeeun) made their first appearance as back-up dancers for G.NA in 2014. They also modeled for the uniform brand Smart, featuring in a promotional music video with the boy groups Got7 and B1A4. Before their official debut, the group began to gain publicity through street performances they held to raise money for children with disabilities. These featured on their web reality show, CLC's Love Chemistry.

2015: Debut and further EP releases

CLC debuted in 2015 with a five-member lineup of Seunghee, Yujin, Seungyeon, Sorn, and Yeeun. They released their first EP First Love, including the lead single "Pepe", on March 19. Their debut showcase was held the day before at the Acts Hotel in Seoul, where they performed their debut song for the first time. They made their debut music show performance on M Countdown. "Pepe" is a retro dance number written by Duble Sidekick and Yang Geng. Part of the song's choreography was choreographed by Rain.

On April 16, CLC released a digital single titled "Eighteen", described as a song about teenage love influenced by 1960s/70s motown and 1980s synthpop. They began promotions for the single the following day on Music Bank. Their second EP Question was released on May 28. Its lead single "Curious (Like)". On October 10–11, CLC held their first overseas promotional tour in Malaysia entitled "First Love Promo Tour in Malaysia". For the tour, Universal Music Malaysia released an "Asia Special Edition" version of Question. The special version included tracks from First Love and Question, as well as the digital single "Eighteen".

2016: Reformation as 7 members and Japanese debut

CLC's third EP Refresh and its lead single "High Heels" were released on February 29, 2016. This marked the addition of two new members: Elkie Chong and Kwon Eun-bin. Eunbin was a participant on Mnet's girl group survival show Produce 101 at the time. Cube Entertainment stated that Eunbin had been part of the group's original lineup but was dropped following delays in production of the group's debut album. Due to Produce 101 contractual restrictions, Eunbin was not able to promote the single "High Heels" on music shows or other broadcasts, nor appear in the single's music video. The agency planned for Eunbin to join promotions in the event that she was eliminated from the show, or else to postpone her activities as part of the group until after Produce 101 promotions if she was a winner. On February 29, a short version of the "High Heels" music video that included Elkie but omitted Eunbin was released. The full version of the music video, including Eunbin, was released on March 21.

CLC made their Japanese debut on April 13 with the release of their first Japanese EP, High Heels. The album includes the Japanese version of "Pepe", "First Love", "Like", "High Heels", and a cover of Kylie Minogue's "I Should Be So Lucky".

On May 12, CLC launched their official Naver V App channel, followed by a broadcast of Eunbin's first live appearance with the group. The group released their fourth Korean EP Nu.Clear on May 30, with the title track "No Oh Oh" written by Shinsadong Tiger. CLC carried out album promotions as a seven-member group in June. On July 27, CLC released their second Japanese EP, Chamisma. The EP peaked at #9 on the Oricon Daily Albums Chart, making it their first release to enter the Top 10 of the Oricon chart.

2017: International Commercial breakthrough 

On January 9, CLC held their first solo Japan fanmeeting at Tower Records in Tokyo. On January 17, 2017, CLC released their fifth Korean EP, Crystyle. It marked a revamped image for the group, with a more charismatic, hip-hop concept. The EP contains six tracks including the EDM/trap lead single "Hobgoblin" (도깨비), which was co-written by Seo Jae-woo, Big Sancho, Son Yeong-jin, and HyunA. Crystyle debuted on Billboard's World Albums chart at #6, while "Hobgoblin" peaked at #4 on the Billboard World Digital Song Sales chart. On May 27, the group held the first fan-meeting for their fan-club, Cheshire, "2017 Cheshire Entrance Ceremony". It took place in the Olympic Hall Muse Live in Seoul.

CLC released their sixth EP, Free'sm on August 3. The album title is portmanteau upon the words "prism" and "free", which describes the group's musical and conceptual direction for this EP. The album is inspired by 1990s girl groups Fin.K.L and S.E.S. It consists of six tracks including the R&B ballad lead single "Where Are You?" (어디야?). This was another new image for the group, contrasting with the group's previous concept with "Hobgoblin".

2018–2019: Black Dress, No.1 and continued releases

The group released the digital single "To The Sky" on February 1, 2018, as a pre-release track of their upcoming EP. The group released their seventh extended play, Black Dress, on February 22. CLC held their third anniversary concert "Black Dress" on April 1. It was a donation-based, charity concert where attendees made donations to a Diabetes Association. CLC held their CLC Live Show In Hong Kong 2018 – Black Dress concert at Macpherson Stadium in Hong Kong on July 20.

On November 20, 2018, Cube Entertainment announced that Elkie would be making her official solo debut on November 23, 2018, with the digital single "I Dream".

On January 30, 2019, CLC released their eighth EP, No.1, with the title track "No". "No" is co-produced and co-written by label-mate Jeon So-yeon and co-written by member Yeeun. No.1 debuted at No. 5 on Billboard's World Albums chart. On February 12, CLC earned their first music show win on The Show with the title track "No".

On May 29, the group released "Me" as a digital single. The song was co-written by member Yeeun.

On September 6, CLC released their fourth digital single "Devil", with Yeeun contributing to the lyrics.

2020–2022: Worldwide recognition, reinvention, members departure and disbandment
On March 1, 2020, Billboard reported that the singles "Me" and "Devil" debuted at number 5 and 7, respectively on the US World Digital Songs chart, months after their official releases with "Me" becoming the second best selling song that week only after BTS' "Black Swan".

In May 2020, Yeeun joined the cast of the Mnet musical reality show, Good Girl. Yeeun participated on 3 songs as part of the Good Girl soundtrack: "Barbie", "Witch", and "Mermaid". She later promoted the former on the 672nd episode of M Countdown. She then released a special solo music video for "Mermaid" on the CLC YouTube channel in the run-up to CLC's September 2020 comeback, Helicopter.
On August 13, 2020, Cube Entertainment announced that CLC would be making their comeback on September 2, 2020, nearly a year after their last release. On August 20, CLC released a new logo, a more simpler and mature monogram with the 'L' being stylised to look like an upside-down '7' in reference to the seven members. On August 21, Dive Studios announced that the group would be the hosts of the third season of the Idol 42 podcast, following CIX and Verivery, starting August 27. On September 2, CLC released their single, "Helicopter". Described as a "trap pop and EDM powerhouse song", "Helicopter" was co-written by member Yeeun. On September 17, 2020, CLC released promotional videos in collaboration with Seongdong-gu district, to promote the district's urban regeneration.

On December 25, 2020, Elkie sent a legal notice to Cube Entertainment requesting termination of her contract. She said she had not been paid for her acting activities, and that Cube Entertainment had already stopped their "developmental support" of CLC, putting the group's future on hold. On February 3, 2021, Cube Entertainment confirmed via an official statement that Elkie is no longer with the group, and her contract with the company has been terminated.

On March 9, 2021, Seunghee, Yeeun and Seungyeon released an OST titled "Another Level" for the Korean web drama Be My Boyfriend. On March 17, Cube Entertainment announced that Sorn would be making her official solo debut on March 23, with the English digital single "Run".

On June 7, 2021, SPOTV News reported that Yujin would be participating in Mnet's survival show, Girls Planet 999. Later, on August 13, 2021, during an interview Yujin gave during the show, she mentioned while tearing up that she had been told by the company that "CLC will no longer be having group activities". Cube Entertainment however did not confirm the statement made. On October 22, during the finale of Girls Planet 999, Yujin ranked 3rd and secured her spot as a member and leader of the debuting group, Kep1er.

On November 16, 2021, Cube Entertainment announced the departure of Sorn after her exclusive contract was terminated.

On March 18, 2022, Cube Entertainment announced that Seungyeon and Yeeun would be leaving the company as they had chosen not to renew their contract with the company.

On May 20, 2022, Cube Entertainment announced the group had officially disbanded with their CLC U Cube global fansite service discontinued on June 6.

Philanthropy 
Prior to their debut, the five original members of CLC busked to raise money for children with developmental disabilities. Profits from their b-side track, "Sharala", from their debut EP, First Love, were also donated to developmental disabilities charities. CLC's 3rd anniversary concert on April 1, 2018, was held for free, attendees had the opportunity to donate to the Pediatric Diabetes Association, which CLC are ambassadors of. On November 17, 2020, CLC was named the ambassador to the "Korea Insulin Dependent Diabetes Association".

Members

Former
 Seunghee – vocalist
 Yujin – vocalist
 Seungyeon – vocalist, leader
 Sorn – vocalist
 Yeeun – rapper, vocalist
 Elkie – vocalist
 Eunbin – vocalist, rapper

Timeline

 Red (vertical) indicates a release.

Discography

Extended plays 

Korean releases
 First Love (2015)
 Question (2015)
 Refresh (2016)
 Nu.Clear (2016)
 Crystyle (2017)
 Free'sm (2017)
 Black Dress (2018)
 No.1 (2019)

Japanese releases
 High Heels (2016)
 Chamisma (2016)

Concerts

Headlining concerts
 CLC 3rd Anniversary Concert – "Black Dress" (April 1, 2018)
 CLC Live Show in Hong Kong 2018 - Black Dress (July 20, 2018)

Showcase
 Premiere Showcase: CLC (January 30, 2019)

Filmography

Reality shows

Podcasts

Awards and nominations

References

External links

 Official site 

 
2015 establishments in South Korea
2022 disestablishments in South Korea
K-pop music groups
Musical groups established in 2015
Musical groups disestablished in 2022
South Korean dance music groups
South Korean girl groups
Cube Entertainment artists